Henri Gaspard de Schaller (8 October 1828 – 18 May 1900) was a Swiss politician and President of the Swiss Council of States (1892/1893).

External links 

 
 

1828 births
1900 deaths
Members of the Council of States (Switzerland)
Presidents of the Council of States (Switzerland)